is a Japanese light novel written by Nisio Isin and illustrated by Hikaru Nakamura. It was published by Shueisha on May 19, 2015. It is a prequel to and ends with their one-shot manga titled "The One Wish That Must Be Granted, and the Ninety-nine That Can Be Done Without", published in Weekly Young Jump on January 8, 2015. The novel is licensed by Viz Media, which released an English translation in October 2017. An anime television series adaptation by Graphinica aired from October 3 to December 19, 2017. The sequel novel  was released on December 12, 2017.

Plot
In a city of half a million people who have all been removed, twelve of the deadliest warriors with the names and attributes of the Chinese zodiac animals are pitted against each other in the twelfth Zodiac Tournament, which takes place every twelve years. During this rendition, each warrior is asked to swallow one of twelve crystallized poison jewels known as Beast Gems (Juseki), which will kill each of the warriors after twelve hours. To be granted any one wish of their choosing, the winner must retrieve all the crystals from the other eleven competitors before the deadline (midnight, December 12). It becomes a ruthless battle where survival is crucial by any means.

Characters
 
Characters are listed in the order of the Chinese Zodiac.
 / 

Rat is a silver-haired teenager who always appears sleepy. He has an ability called "The Hundred Paths of Nezumi-san," which allows him to choose or experience 100 possible realities. His selected path becomes the factual reality; however, the process is mentally exhausting, which explains his sleepy appearance. Additionally, there are situations where none of the routes turn out well for him. He allies with the pacifist Monkey. His way of killing is "killing all". He is the only one in the tournament without a wish.
 / 

Ox is a horned man with long black hair who carries a long thin saber called "Goboken". He is regarded as the "Genius of Slaughter", a peerless warrior and one of the tournament's favorites. His way of killing is "killing systematically". The Rat never learns the Ox's wish as he is only given questions in response. 
 / 

Tiger is a young orange-haired woman with a long chain extending from a collar around her neck and a tendency to drink to excess. She is a former martial arts master turned soldier who discovered her bestial drunken fist techniques after a night of despair-driven binge drinking. She encountered Ox years earlier on a battlefield and was influenced by his philosophy. During the tournament, she agrees to a truce with Ox for their mutual benefit. Her way of killing is "killing in a drunken rage". According to the Rat, her wish has something to do with meeting Ox again.

Rabbit is a muscular white-haired, psychotic young man who fights with two long knives. He used speed and agility to close in on his opponents. He is also a necromantist who can control the bodies of those he's killed like puppets, whom he calls his "friends". The puppets retain their original abilities. The necromancy also applies to Rabbit himself after his technically self-inflicted death, continuing his efforts to win the match. One of the favorites of the competition. His way of killing is "killing psychotically". According to the Rat, his wish is to be "friends" with everyone in the world.
 / 

Dragon is the older twin brother of Snake. He can fly using an ability known as "Heaven's Holding" and uses liquid nitrogen in a tank on his back to create a stream of freezing air. He and his brother have the same way of killing, "killing for money". According to the Rat, his wish is for money.
 / 

Snake is the younger twin brother of Dragon and uses a flamethrower with a fuel tank on his back. He possesses a radar-like sense by feeling vibrations in the ground around him; this ability is known as "Earth's Guidance". He and his brother have the same way of killing, "killing for money". According to the Rat, his wish is for money.
 / 

Horse is a self-proclaimed moderate of enormous stature. He was a soldier who became a warrior after his body was modified with the help of medicine and science to gain incredible strength and developed an impenetrable defensive technique called the "Stirrup". He hopes to ally with Ox during the tournament. His way of killing is "killing silently". According to the Rat, his wish is to have talent.
 / 

Sheep is a short, older man with horns and a past winner of the Juni Taisen. He is a master of explosives and grenades, honed as an arms dealer and smuggler from his younger years. He volunteers to join the present Juni Taisen to spare his family despite his low chances of success. His way of killing is "killing deceptively". According to the Rat, his wish is for his family to live in peace.
 / 

Monkey is a short-haired, spectacled, young woman. She is a renowned pacifist and mediator, responsible for facilitating countless ceasefires across many battles, but with mixed results for the surviving populations. At the start of the tournament, she proposes a peace agreement; the tournament winner would wish all competitors back to life, so no warrior would have to die permanently. She allies with Rat during the tournament. Monkey possesses the power to transmute any material she touches into another state, such as turning stone into sand. She can use transmutation skills with her unparalleled martial arts and superhuman physical prowess. One of the favorites to win the tournament. Her way of killing is "killing peacefully".
 / 

Chicken is a young, green-haired woman in a revealing outfit made of feathers. At first, she appears to be a timid individual, but this is later revealed to be a façade to manipulate those around her. She possesses the ability "Eye of the Cormorant", which allows her to communicate with and control birds. During the tournament, she approaches Dog with an alliance to defeat Rabbit and his puppets. Her way of killing is "killing by pecking". According to the Rat, her wish is to have confidence.
 / 

Dog is a dark-haired man with a canine-like appearance. He can produce deadly poisons for both killing enemies and doping allies. His most prized drug is known as "One Man's Army", giving a huge strength buff to whoever he injects. He also believes he can synthesize an antidote to the poison gem within his body. He agrees to ally with Chicken, although he has little respect for her fighting abilities. His way of killing is "killing by biting". According to the Rat, his wish has something to do with his adopted daughter but is never fully revealed.
 / 

Boar is a young, voluptuous, blond-haired woman and the daughter of the previous tournament's winner. Although initially reluctant to kill when she was younger, she earned her position by driving her younger sister to suicide when their father did not choose her for the tournament. She uses twin heavy machine guns with a "Non-reload" ability, giving her unlimited ammunition. Her way of killing is "killing bountifully". According to the Rat, her wish is to have a harem of 3.5 billion men.

Duodecuple is the mysterious referee whose job is to host and manage the Zodiac Tournament and grant the winner's wish. The tournament is a proxy battle for control of the countries possessed and to control the betting on the outcome. He monitors the tournament in the presence of faceless VIP avatars. When only six warriors remain, the VIPs can begin wagering on individual warriors. When only three warriors remain, they can bet on the outcome.

Media

Light novel
Nisio Isin and Hikaru Nakamura wrote and illustrated the novel respectively, which was published by Shueisha on May 19, 2015. Viz Media have licensed the light novel for an English release in 2017. Its light novel sequel was released on December 12, 2017.

A prequel short-story to Jūni Taisen Tai Jūni Taisen titled  was included in the November 2017 issue of Jump Square bonus booklet released on October 4, 2017. It was later reprinted in the fourth volume of the manga adaptation.

Manga
A one-shot manga titled , published in Weekly Young Jump on January 8, 2015.

A manga adaptation by Akira Akatsuki has been announced and was serialized in Shueisha's Shōnen Jump+ app and website on September 23, 2017. Viz Media started distributing the manga via Weekly Shonen Jump on September 23, 2017. It was published until May 12, 2018 and collected into four volumes.

Anime

An anime adaptation is produced by Graphinica, with Naoto Hosoda directing, Sadayuki Murai writing scripts, Chikashi Kadekaru designing characters, and Go Shiina composing the music. It aired from October 3 to December 19, 2017. It ran for 12 episodes. Crunchyroll streamed the series. Funimation streamed the series with a simuldub. In Australia and New Zealand, Madman Entertainment is distributing the series, on behalf of Funimation.

References

External links
 

2017 anime television series debuts
2015 Japanese novels
Anime and manga based on light novels
Chinese mythology in anime and manga
Fiction about death games
Funimation
Graphinica
Light novels
Shueisha books
Shueisha manga
Shōnen manga
Viz Media manga
Viz Media novels
Nisio Isin